Castellacci is a surname. Notable people with the surname include: 

Agostino Castellacci (born 1670), Italian painter
Francesco Castellacci (born 1987), Italian racing driver
Luigi Castellacci (1797–1845), Italian musician and composer

See also
Castellucci